Moose Cree is a dialect of the Cree language spoken mainly in Moose Factory, Ontario.

Classification 
As a dialect of the Cree language, Moose Cree is classified under the Algonquian branch of the Algic language family.

Name
The former is the historical name for the summering grounds of the speakers of this dialect, but has been appropriated by the modern municipality of Moosonee, leaving the island with the official English name of Moose Factory, a name that recalls the historical presence of a Hudson's Bay trading post, originally called 'factories'. The above-mentioned hydronym refers to the river where the said island is located.

Official status 
In Ontario, the Cree language has no official status.

Orthography 
Moose Cree is traditionally written in the Eastern Syllabics, a variant of syllabics used by Cree dialects spoken in communities where the Anglican church once had a strong presence, namely Fort Albany and Moose Factory in Ontario, as well as the Cree communities in Quebec. The Latin alphabet is also in use locally, as a phonetic and non-standard script in hymnals and various locally produced materials and as a standardized script in pedagogical materials. The latter use is based on standardization efforts for the Cree language at large.

Phonology
Preservation of the Proto-Algonquian *k as 
Preservation of the Proto-Algonquian *r as a distinctive consonant 
Preservation of the phonological status of all eight Proto-Algonquian vowels, except for Proto-Algonquian *e on occasion.

References

Cree language
Central Algonquian languages
Indigenous languages of the North American eastern woodlands
First Nations languages in Canada